The Tuatapere Branch, including the Orawia Branch, was a branch line railway in Southland, New Zealand.  Although the Tuatapere and Orawia Branches look like a single line, operationally they were considered separate lines.  The first section opened to Riverton in 1879 and reached Tuatapere three decades later.  The extension from Tuatapere to Orawia operated from 1925 until 1970.  In 1976 the Tuatapere Branch was truncated to Riverton, and was known as the Riverton Branch until 1978, when it closed beyond Thornbury.  The remaining portion of the line is now part of the Wairio Branch.

Construction

The desire to open up regions west of Invercargill prompted construction of this line, with developers hoping to discover plentiful minerals and resources, and encourage more substantial settlement in the area.  The first section of the line was built from Makarewa on the Kingston Branch to Riverton via Thornbury, the Wairio Branch junction, and opened on 9 June 1879.  The line was opened in stages: Colac on 25 July 1881, Roundhill on 24 September 1883, Orepuki on 5 May 1885, Waihoaka on 1 October 1903 and Tuatapere on 1 October 1909.

There was some dispute over where to commence a railway to the settlement of Orawia.  One of the two main proposals was to extend the Tuatapere line, and the other was to build a branch from Waikouro on the Wairio Branch.  Ultimately, the Tuatapere proposal was accepted, and although construction was postponed due to World War I, work had recommenced by October 1919 and the Public Works Department was operating trains by mid-September 1924. The line was handed over to the New Zealand Railways Department (NZR) and officially opened on 20 October 1925.

Operation
The line was run as two separate branches from Tuatapere: the Tuatapere Branch from Invercargill, and the Orawia Branch.  During the days of steam motive power, most services on the branches were operated from a depot at Tuatapere.  Trains were typically mixed, carrying both passengers and freight. One such train daily operated from Tuatapere to Invercargill and return, while another ran Invercargill to Tuatapere and return.  Orawia was served by a service from Tuatapere on Mondays, Wednesdays and Fridays.  Along the line, a lucrative logging industry was established and many bush tramways were built to provide easy cartage of logs to the railway line. A timber mill was established in Tuatapere to process the logs and it provided much traffic for the railway.  In the early days of the line, oil shale was a prominent source of freight from Orepuki.  The railway was also indispensable in helping to develop the Waiau River valley and its settlements.

The tramway was open from 1902 to 1960.

Passenger services on the Orawia Branch did not last even a decade. By 1932, passengers were no longer carried and goods trains ran only twice weekly.  Passengers could travel on the rest of the line until the early 1950s, and around this time the daily Invercargill to Tuatapere and return goods train was withdrawn. This was partially offset by a Monday to Friday goods train from the Wairio Branch junction at Thornbury to Tuatapere. The Orawia Branch looked as if it could be closed at any time until a cement works was constructed in the town in 1956.  It provided sufficient traffic to justify the Orawia Branch's existence.

Traffic declined during the 1960s, and when steam motive power was replaced by DJ class diesel-electrics in June 1968, Tuatapere locomotive depot closed and services changed to operate out of Invercargill thrice weekly, on Monday, Wednesday and Friday. In May 1968 the cement works in Orawia closed, and deprived of its main source of traffic, the Orawia Branch closed on 1 October 1970. By the mid-1970s, only 4,500 tonnes of traffic yearly were railed west of Riverton and the line was cut back to Riverton on 30 July 1976. There were expectations that forestry developments would create sufficient traffic from Riverton, but these failed to eventuate and the line from Thornbury was closed on 15 January 1978. A minor protest to keep the Thornbury to Riverton section open for tourism and potential private railway operations, was to no avail. The section from Makarewa and Thornbury became part of the Wairio Branch.

Today
Some notable relics remained after closure. The most significant of these was the causeway and truss bridge that crossed the mouth of the Jacob River estuary in Riverton. The bridge and formation was removed in 2003, with one truss preserved by a local museum. The wooden viaduct near Tuatapere still exists. Tuatapere station and yard area are used by the local Jewish community, with the goods shed, station building, and water tank all standing in relatively good condition, though the station building's exterior requires repairs and there are proposals to relocate it to a site on the Otago Central Rail Trail.  The Orawia Branch's formation is distinct for much of its length, and at the terminus is the goods shed, with the ruins of the old cement works nearby.  The formation of the Tuatapere Branch is also pretty clear in most places, and in Wakatapu some discarded rails and sleepers are at the old yard site, while a loading bank is at Ruahine and relocated station buildings still stand at Longwood and Orepuki.

References

Citations

Bibliography

External links 
 Photo of preserved bush tramway loco at Riverton

Railway lines in New Zealand
Rail transport in Southland, New Zealand
Railway lines opened in 1879